Pierre's armina, scientific name Armina sp. (as designated by Zsilavecz, 2007) , is a species of sea slug, a nudibranch. It is a marine gastropod mollusc in the family Arminidae. This species was undescribed by science as of November 2009.

Distribution
In 2009, this species had only been found off South Africa, in False Bay off Windmill Beach, in at least 10 m of water. It appears to be endemic.

Description
It is a black-bodied nudibranch with raised white longitudinal ridges. The edge of the mantle is yellow and the foot is pinkish with a yellow margin. It has small ridged rhinophores,  which are close together at their base.

Ecology
Pierre's armina burrows in sand and feeds on the purple sea pen, Actinoptilum molle.

References

Arminidae
Undescribed gastropod species